Adailma Aparecida da Silva dos Santos (born 24 March 1996), known as Duda Santos or just Duda, is a Brazilian professional footballer who plays as a midfielder for Palmeiras.

Club career
Born in Major Isidoro, Alagoas, Duda played futsal and made her senior debut in football with Chapecoense in 2014. In 2017, after a short period at Kindermann/Avaí, she moved abroad with Israeli club Kiryat Gat.

Duda returned to Brazil and Avaí in 2018, being a regular starter until rescinding her contract in January 2021. Late in the month, she joined Palmeiras.

International career
After representing Brazil at under-20 level, Duda received her first call up for the full side on 9 November 2020, for friendlies against Argentina. She made her international debut on 27 November of that year, coming on as a second-half substitute for Adriana and scoring the side's sixth in a 6–0 win over Ecuador at the Arena Corinthians.

Career statistics

International

References

External links

1997 births
Living people
Sportspeople from Alagoas
Brazilian women's footballers
Women's association football midfielders
Campeonato Brasileiro de Futebol Feminino Série A1 players
Ligat Nashim players
F.C. Kiryat Gat (women) players
Sociedade Esportiva Palmeiras (women) players
Brazil women's international footballers
Brazilian expatriate footballers
Brazilian expatriate sportspeople in Israel
Expatriate women's footballers in Israel